Jahjouh is a small town and rural commune in El Hajeb Province of the Fès-Meknès region of Morocco. At the time of the 2004 census, the commune had a total population of 7689 people living in 1388 households.

References

Populated places in El Hajeb Province
Rural communes of Fès-Meknès